Mary Stewart, Countess of Arran (13 May 1453 – May 1488) was the eldest daughter of King James II of Scotland and Mary of Guelders. King James III of Scotland was her eldest brother. She married twice: firstly, to Thomas Boyd, 1st Earl of Arran; secondly, to James Hamilton, 1st Lord Hamilton. It was through her children by her second husband that the Hamilton earls of Arran and the Stewart earls of Lennox derived their claim to the Kingdom of Scotland.

Family
Mary was born at Stirling Castle on 13 May 1453, the eldest daughter of James II of Scotland and Mary of Guelders. She had five siblings, including James III, who ascended the Scottish throne in 1460 upon their father's accidental death by an exploding cannon. Mary's mother died in 1463, leaving her an orphan at the age of ten.

Marriages and issue
Mary was married to her first husband, Thomas Boyd, Earl of Arran, when she was thirteen years old, before 26 April 1467. The Isle of Arran was given as her dowry upon her marriage. Law Castle in North Ayrshire was built for the couple. In 1467, Mary's husband Thomas was sent to Denmark to escort King James III's bride, Margaret of Denmark. During his absence, Mary's brother, the King, became alienated from Mary's husband by the enemies of the Clan Boyd who brought false charges of treason against Thomas and his father, Robert Boyd, 1st Lord Boyd. Mary, upon hearing that her husband was to be summoned before the king and Parliament to answer the charges, immediately went to the harbour of Leith when Thomas' ship docked in July, to forewarn him. Mary and Thomas then promptly sailed to Denmark. On 22 November 1469, Mary's husband was attainted, and his title, honours, and estates were forfeited to the crown. She later returned to Scotland in an attempt to have her husband cleared of all charges laid against him. Upon her arrival in Scotland, her brother James detained her in custody at Dean Castle in Kilmarnock, until her marriage was annulled. Mary's marriage to Thomas was then declared void in 1473, and she was forced to marry James Hamilton, 1st Lord Hamilton.

Thomas and Mary together had two children:
 Lady Margaret Boyd (1468–1533), married, firstly, Alexander Forbes, 4th Lord Forbes; secondly, Sir David Kennedy, 1st Earl of Cassilis. 
 James Boyd, 2nd Lord Boyd of Kilmarnock (1469–1484), died unmarried.
In early 1474, Mary married, as her second husband, James Hamilton, 1st Lord Hamilton, who was almost forty years her senior. They received a papal dispensation on 26 April 1476 thus legitimising the two children already born to them. Together James and Mary had three children:
 Hon. Elizabeth Hamilton (died after April 1531), married, on 9 April 1494, Matthew Stewart, 2nd Earl of Lennox, by whom she had issue. The Stewarts of Lennox, of whom Henry Stuart, Lord Darnley, the second husband of Mary, Queen of Scots, was the most notable, who derived his claim to the Scottish throne from Elizabeth's son John Stewart, 3rd Earl of Lennox.
 James Hamilton, 1st Earl of Arran (1475–1529), married, firstly, in 1490, Elizabeth Home by whom he had two daughters; he divorced Elizabeth in 1504. He married, secondly, in 1516, Janet Bethune, daughter of Sir David Bethune, 1st of Creich and Janet Duddlingston, by whom he had three children including his heir, James Hamilton, Duke of Châtellerault, 2nd Earl of Arran (c. 1516 – 22 January 1575), heir presumptive to the Kingdom of Scotland (2 July 1536 – 22 May 1540), (April 1541– 8 December 1542), (14 December 1542 – 19 June 1566), and (29 July 1567 – 22 January 1575); Regent of Scotland (1542–1554).
 Robert Hamilton, Seigneur d'Aubigny (21 March 1476 – 1543). He was born at Brodick Castle, Isle of Arran, Scotland. He died in 1543 in Torrence, Lanarkshire, Scotland, when he was 66 years old. According to some records, he married (Elizabeth?) Campbell, the daughter of Campbell (Goodman) of Glaister, or Glacester (Angus), the niece of the Sheriff of Ayr (the latter of whom also had connection to the earls of Lennox). They had at least two (claimed) children: Janet Hamilton, born in 1500, who wed Alexander Burnet, 4th Baron & 9th Laird of Leys; and Matthew Hamilton, born in 1512, who wed Jean Muirhead of Torrence.
Mary's son by her first husband Thomas, James Boyd, 2nd Lord Boyd of Kilmarnock, was killed at the age of fifteen by Lord Montgomerie, which ignited a feud that lasted for over seventy years. Lady Margaret Boyd, her daughter by Thomas, lived to the age of forty-eight. Although she was married twice, neither marriage produced children.

Mary died in 1488 at the age of thirty-five.

Due to their proximity to the throne, Mary's descendants, the Hamiltons of Arran and the Stewarts of Lennox, would obtain considerable power, and play conspicuous roles in 16th-century Scottish politics; especially affecting the life and reign of Mary, Queen of Scots, the great-granddaughter of her brother, James III.

References

Mary Stewart, Countess of Arran
Mary Stewart, Countess of Arran
Mary
Mary Stewart, Countess of Arran
Arran
Hamilton
15th-century Scottish women
15th-century Scottish people
Daughters of kings